Taleh Gongah (also Romanized as Taleh Gongāh; also known as Taleh Kangān and Taleh Kongāh) is a village in Gurab Pas Rural District, in the Central District of Fuman County, Gilan Province, Iran. At the 2006 census, its population was 151, in 39 families.

References 

Populated places in Fuman County